The Tennessee Bar Association (TBA) is a voluntary bar association for the state of Tennessee.

History
On December 14, 1881, 69 Tennessee lawyers signed the Charter of Incorporation establishing the Tennessee Bar Association.

References

External links
 Official website

Tennessee
Organizations based in Nashville, Tennessee
Organizations established in 1881
1881 establishments in Tennessee